Gonzalo may refer to:

 Gonzalo (name)
 Gonzalo, Dominican Republic, a small town 
 Isla Gonzalo, a subantarctic island operated by the Chilean Navy
 Hurricane Gonzalo, 2014

See also 
 Gonzalez (disambiguation)
 Gonzales (disambiguation)
 Gonsalves (disambiguation)
 Gonçalves, a name
 Abimael Guzmán, Peruvian Maoist revolutionary also known by his nom de guerre Chairman Gonzalo